Wrangel Island is an island of the Chukotka Autonomous Okrug, Russia. It is the 91st largest island in the world and roughly the size of Crete. Located in the Arctic Ocean between the Chukchi Sea and East Siberian Sea, the island lies astride the 180th meridian. The International Date Line is therefore displaced eastwards at this latitude to avoid the island as well as the Chukchi Peninsula on the Russian mainland, to keep the island on the same day as the rest of Russia. Wrangel Island is the last known place where woolly mammoths survived, until around 4,000 years ago.

Most of Wrangel Island and the nearby Herald Island is a federally protected nature sanctuary administered by Russia's Ministry of Natural Resources and Environment. The island, and its surrounding waters, were classified as a "Zapovednik" (a "strict nature reserve") in 1976 and, as such, receive the highest level of protection and exclude practically all human activity other than for scientific purposes. As of 2003, there were four rangers who reside on the island year-round, while a core group of about 12 scientists conduct research during the summer months.

Toponymy
Captain Thomas Long named Wrangel Island for Baron Ferdinand von Wrangel, who was a Baltic German explorer and Admiral in the Imperial Russian Navy. Captain Long, published in The Honolulu Advertiser, November 1867:

Baron von Wrangel never managed to visit the island. Wrangel had noticed swarms of birds flying north, and, questioning the native population, determined that there must be an island undiscovered by Europeans existing in the Arctic Ocean. He searched for it during his Kolymskaya expedition (1823–1824), but failed to find it.

Geography
It is separated from the Siberian mainland by the Long Strait, and the island itself is a landmark separating the East Siberian Sea from the Chukchi Sea on the northern end.

The island's mountain ranges terminate at sea cliffs at either end of the island. Blossom Point is the westernmost point and Waring Point (Mys Uering) the easternmost point of the island. Despite its mountainous terrain and high latitude, Wrangel Island is not glaciated.

Wrangel Island belongs administratively to the Chukotka Autonomous Okrug of the Russian Federation. The island has a weather station at Blossom Point and, formerly, two Chukchi fishing settlements on the southern side of the island (Ushakovskoye and Zvyozdny on the shore of Somnitelnaya Bay).

Geology

Wrangel Island consists of folded, faulted, and metamorphosed volcanic, intrusive, and sedimentary rocks ranging in age from Upper Precambrian to Lower Mesozoic. These rocks are intruded by metamorphosed gabbro, diabase, and felsic dikes and sills and granite intrusions.

A thin veneer of Cenozoic gravel, sand, clay and mud underlie the coastal plains of Wrangel Island. Late Neogene clay and gravel, which are only a few tens of meters thick, rest upon the eroded surface of the folded and faulted strata that compose Wrangel Island. Indurated Pliocene mud and gravel, which are only a few meters thick, overlie the Late Neogene sediments. Sandy Pleistocene sediments occur as fluvial sediments along rivers and streams and as a very thin and patchy surficial layer of either colluvium or eluvium.

Flora and fauna

Wrangel Island is a breeding ground for polar bears (having the highest density of dens in the world), seals, walrus, and lemmings. During the summer it is visited by many types of birds. Arctic foxes also make their home on the island. Cetaceans such as bowhead whales, gray whales, and belugas can be seen close to shore.

Woolly mammoths survived there until 2500–2000 BC, the most recent survival of all known mammoth populations.
Mammoths generally died and disappeared from mainland Eurasia and North America around 10,000 years ago; however, about 500–1,000 mammoths isolated on Wrangel Island continued to survive for another 6,000 years.

Domestic reindeer were introduced in the 1950s and their numbers are managed at around 1,000 in order to reduce their impact on nesting bird grounds. In 1975, the musk ox was also introduced. The population has grown from 20 to about 1000 animals. In 2002, wolves were spotted on the island; wolves lived on the island in historical times.

The flora includes 417 species of plants, double that of any other Arctic tundra territory of comparable size and more than any other Arctic island.  For these reasons, the island was proclaimed the northernmost World Heritage Site in 2004.

Important Bird Area
Wrangel Island, along with nearby Herald Island, has been designated an Important Bird Area (IBA) by BirdLife International because it supports breeding populations of many species of birds, including brent and snow geese, common eiders, Ross's and ivory gulls, and black guillemots.

Climate

Wrangel Island has a severe polar climate (Köppen ET). The region is blanketed by dry and cold Arctic air masses for most of the year. Warmer and more humid air can reach the island from the south-east during summer. Dry and heated air from Siberia comes to the island periodically.

Wrangel Island is influenced by both the Arctic and Pacific air masses. One consequence is the predominance of high winds. The island is subjected to "cyclonic" episodes characterized by rapid circular winds. It is also an island of mists and fogs.

Winters are prolonged and are characterized by steady frosty weather and high northerly winds. During this period, the temperatures usually stay well below freezing for months.

There are noticeable differences in climate between the northern, central and southern parts of the island. The central and southern portions are warmer, with some of their valleys having semi-continental climates that support a number of sub-Arctic steppe-like meadow species. This area has been described as perhaps being a relict of the Ice Age Mammoth steppe, along with certain areas along the northwestern border between Mongolia and Russia.

The short summers are cool but comparatively mild as the polar day generally keeps temperatures above . Some frosts and snowfalls occur, and fog is common. Warmer and drier weather is experienced in the center of the island because the interior's topography encourages foehn winds. As of 2003, the frost-free period on the island was very short, usually not more than 20 to 25 days, and more often only two weeks. Average relative humidity is about 83%.

Waters on and around Wrangel
The waters of the East Siberian Sea and the Sea of Chukchi surrounding Wrangel and Herald Islands are classified as a separate chemical oceanographic region. These waters have among the lowest levels of salinity in the Arctic basin as well as a very high oxygen content and increased biogenic elements.

History

First human settlements and the extinction of the woolly mammoth
This remote Arctic island is believed to have been the final place on Earth to support woolly mammoths as an isolated population until their extinction about 2000 BC, which makes them the most recent surviving population known to science. Initially, it was assumed that this was a specific dwarf variant of the species originating from Siberia. However, after further evaluation, these Wrangel island mammoths are no longer considered to have been dwarfs. The presence of modern humans using advanced hunting and survival skills probably hastened their demise on this frozen isle, which until recently was ice bound for most years with infrequent breaks of clear water in some Arctic summers. An actual case of insular dwarfism can be found in the dwarf elephant on Malta, originating from the European species.

Evidence for prehistoric human occupation was uncovered in 1975 at the Chertov Ovrag site. Various stone and ivory tools were found, including a toggling harpoon. Radiocarbon dating shows the human inhabitation roughly coeval with the last mammoths on the island c. 1700 BC. Though no direct evidence of mammoth hunting has been found, it remains a scientific hypothesis. The presence of mammoths on Wrangel Island more than 5000 years after their extinction on the mainland, is considered possible evidence that climate change was not the cause of the quaternary extinction event. This is a different scenario than the extinction of woolly mammoth on Saint Paul Island in modern-day Alaska. Many authors today argue that the most likely cause of extinction of the mammoth in the continents was excessive hunting.

Research published in 2017 suggested that the mammoth population was experiencing a genetic meltdown in the DNA of the last animals, a difference when compared with examples about 40,000 years earlier, when populations were plentiful. The research suggests the signature of a genomic meltdown in small populations, consistent with nearly neutral genome evolution. It also suggests large numbers of detrimental variants collecting in pre-extinction genomes, a warning for continued efforts to protect current endangered species with small population sizes.

Paleoeskimos established camps on the southern side of the island for marine hunters. By the time Europeans arrived at Wrangel Island there was no aboriginal population.

A legend prevalent among the Chukchi people of Siberia tells of a chief Krachai (or Krächoj, Krahay, Khrakhai), who fled with his people (the Krachaians or Krahays, also identified as the Onkilon or Omoki – Siberian Yupik people) across the ice to settle in a northern land. Though the story may be mythical, the existence of an island or continent to the north was lent credence by the annual migration of reindeer across the ice, as well as the appearance of slate spear-points washed up on Arctic shores, made in a fashion unknown to the Chukchi. Retired University of Alaska, Fairbanks linguistics professor Michael E. Krauss has presented archaeological, historical, and linguistic evidence that Wrangel Island was a way station on a trade route linking the Inuit settlement at Point Hope, Alaska with the north Siberian coast, and that the coast was colonized in late prehistoric and early historic times by Inuit settlers from North America. Krauss suggests that the departure of these colonists was related to the Krachai legend.

Outside discovery

In 1764, the Cossack Sergeant Stepan Andreyev claimed to have sighted this island. Calling it Tikegen Land, Andreyev found evidence of its inhabitants, the Krahay. Eventually, the island was named after Baron Ferdinand von Wrangel, who, after reading Andreyev's report and hearing Chukchi stories of land at the island's coordinates, set off on an expedition (1820–1824) to discover the island, with no success.

British, American, and Russian expeditions
In 1849, Henry Kellett, captain of HMS Herald, landed on and named it Herald Island. He erroneously thought he saw another island to the west, which he called Plover Island; thereafter it was indicated on British admiralty charts as Kellett Land.

Eduard Dallmann, a German whaler, reported in 1881 that he had landed on the island in 1866.

In August 1867, Thomas Long, an American whaling captain, "approached it as near as fifteen miles. I have named this northern land Wrangell [sic] Land ... as an appropriate tribute to the memory of a man who spent three consecutive years north of latitude 68°, and demonstrated the problem of this open polar sea forty-five years ago, although others of much later date have endeavored to claim the merit of this discovery." An account appeared in the Proceedings of the American Association for the Advancement of Science, 1868 (17th Meeting, at Chicago), published in 1869, under the title "The New Arctic Continent, or Wrangell's Land, discovered 14 August 1867, by Captain Long, of the American Ship Nile, and seen by Captains Raynor, Bliven and others, with a brief Notice of Baron Wrangell's Exploration in 1823".

George W. DeLong, commanding USS Jeannette, led an expedition in 1879 attempting to reach the North Pole, expecting to go by the "east side of Kellett land", which he thought extended far into the Arctic. His ship became locked in the polar ice pack and drifted westward, passing within sight of Wrangel before being crushed and sunk in the vicinity of the New Siberian Islands.

A party from the USRC Corwin landed on Wrangel Island on 12 August 1881, claimed the island for the United States and named it "New Columbia". The expedition, under the command of Calvin L. Hooper, was seeking the Jeannette and two missing whalers in addition to conducting general exploration. It included naturalist John Muir, who published the first description of Wrangel Island. In the same year on 23 August, the USS Rodgers, commanded by Lieutenant R. M. Berry during the second search for the Jeannette, landed a party on Wrangel Island that stayed about two weeks and conducted an extensive survey of the southern coast.

In 1911, the Russian Arctic Ocean Hydrographic Expedition on icebreakers Vaygach and Taymyr under Boris Vilkitsky, landed on the island. In 1916 the Tsarist government declared that the island belonged to the Russian Empire.

Stefansson expeditions
In 1914, members of the Canadian Arctic Expedition, organized by Vilhjalmur Stefansson, were marooned on Wrangel Island for nine months after their ship, Karluk, was crushed in the ice pack. The survivors were rescued by the American motorized fishing schooner King & Winge after Captain Robert Bartlett walked across the Chukchi Sea to Siberia to summon help.

In 1921, Stefansson sent five settlers (the Canadian Allan Crawford, three Americans: Fred Maurer, Lorne Knight and Milton Galle, and Iñupiat seamstress and cook Ada Blackjack) to the island in a speculative attempt to claim it for Canada.  The explorers were handpicked by Stefansson based upon their previous experience and academic credentials. Stefansson considered those with advanced knowledge in the fields of geography and science for this expedition. At the time, Stefansson claimed that his purpose was to head off a possible Japanese claim. An attempt to relieve this group in 1922 failed when the schooner Teddy Bear under Captain Joe Bernard became stuck in the ice. In 1923, the sole survivor of the Wrangel Island expedition, Ada Blackjack, was rescued by a ship that left another party of 13 (American Charles Wells and 12 Inuit).

In 1924, the Soviet Union removed the American and 13 Inuit (one was born on the island) of this settlement aboard the Krasny Oktyabr (Red October). Wells subsequently died of pneumonia in Vladivostok during a diplomatic American-Soviet row about an American boundary marker on the Siberian coast, and so did an Inuit child. The others were deported from Vladivostok to the Chinese border post Suifenhe, but the Chinese government did not want to accept them as the American consul in Harbin told them the Inuit were not American citizens. Later, the American government came up with a statement that the Inuit were 'wards' of the United States, but that there were no funds for returning them. Eventually, the American Red Cross came up with $1600 for their return. They subsequently moved through Dalian, Kobe and Seattle (where another Inuit child drowned during the wait for the return trip to Alaska) back to Nome.

During the Soviet trip, the American reindeer owner Carl J. Lomen from Nome had taken over the possessions of Stefansson and had acquired explicit support ("go and hold it") from US Secretary of State Charles Evans Hughes to claim the island for the United States, a goal about which the Russian expedition got to hear during their trip. Lomen dispatched the MS Herman, commanded by captain Louis L. Lane. Due to unfavorable ice conditions, the Herman could not get any further than Herald Island, where the American flag was raised.

In 1926, the government of the Soviet Union reaffirmed the Tsarist claim to sovereignty over Wrangel Island.

Soviet administration

In 1926, a team of Soviet explorers, equipped with three years of supplies, landed on Wrangel Island. Clear waters that facilitated the 1926 landing were followed by years of continuous heavy ice surrounding the island. Attempts to reach the island by sea failed, and it was feared that the team would not survive their fourth winter.

In 1929, the icebreaker Fyodor Litke was chosen for a rescue operation. It sailed from Sevastopol, commanded by captain Konstantin Dublitsky. On 4 July, it reached Vladivostok where all Black Sea sailors were replaced by local crew members. Ten days later Litke sailed north; it passed the Bering Strait, and tried to pass Long Strait and approach the island from south. On 8 August a scout plane reported impassable ice in the strait, and Litke turned north, heading to Herald Island. It failed to escape mounting ice; August 12 the captain shut down the engines to save coal and had to wait two weeks until the ice pressure eased. Making a few hundred meters a day, Litke reached the settlement August 28. On September 5, Litke turned back, taking all the 'islanders' to safety. This operation earned Litke the order of the Red Banner of Labour (January 20, 1930), as well as commemorative badges for the crew.

According to a 1936 article in Time magazine, Wrangel Island became the scene of a bizarre criminal story in the 1930s when it fell under the increasingly arbitrary rule of its appointed governor Konstantin Semenchuk. Semenchuk controlled the local populace and his own staff through open extortion and murder. He forbade the local Yupik Eskimos (recruited from Provideniya Bay in 1926) to hunt walrus, which put them in danger of starvation, while collecting food for himself. He was then implicated in the mysterious deaths of some of his opponents, including the local doctor. Allegedly, he ordered his subordinate, the sledge driver Stepan Startsev, to murder Dr. Nikolai Vulfson, who had attempted to stand up to Semenchuk, on 27 December 1934 (though there were also rumours that Startsev had fallen in love with Vulfson's wife, Dr. Gita Feldman, and killed him out of jealousy). The subsequent trial in May–June 1936, at the Supreme Court of the RSFSR, sentenced Semenchuk and Startsev to death for "banditry" and violation of Soviet law, and "the most publicised result of the trial was the joy of the liberated Eskimos". This trial had the result of launching the career of the prosecutor, Andrey Vyshinsky, who called the two defendants "human waste" and who would soon achieve great notoriety in the Moscow Trials.

In 1948, a small herd of domestic reindeer was introduced with the intention of establishing commercial herding to generate income for island residents.

Moreover, a military radar installation was built on the southeast coast at Cape Hawaii. Rock crystal mining had been carried out for a number of years in the center of the island near Khrustalnyi Creek. At the time, a small settlement, Perkatkun, had been established nearby to house the miners, but later on it was completely destroyed.

Establishment of Federal Nature Reserve
On 25 May 1999, the (regional) Governor of Chukotka issued Decree No. 91, which again expanded the protected water area to  around Wrangel and Herald Islands.

By the 1980s, the reindeer-herding farm on Wrangel had been abolished and the settlement of Zvezdnyi was virtually abandoned. Hunting had already been stopped, except for a small quota of marine mammals for the needs of the local population. In 1992, the military radar installation at Cape Hawaii (on the southeast coast) was closed, and only the settlement of Ushakovskoe remained occupied.

Post-Soviet era
According to some American activists and government officials, at least eight Arctic islands currently controlled by Russia, including Wrangel Island, are claimed or should be claimed by the United States. However, according to the United States Department of State no such claim exists. The USSR–USA Maritime Boundary Agreement, which has yet to be approved by the Russian Duma, does not specifically address the status of these islands nor the maritime boundaries associated with them.

On 1 June 1990, US Secretary of State James Baker signed an executive agreement with Eduard Shevardnadze, the Soviet foreign minister. It specified that even though the treaty had not been ratified, the U.S. and the USSR agreed to abide by the terms of the treaty beginning 15 June 1990. The Senate ratified the USSR–USA Maritime Boundary Agreement in 1991, which was then signed by President George H. W. Bush.

In 2004, Wrangel Island and neighboring Herald Island, along with their surrounding waters, were added to UNESCO's World Heritage List.

Russian naval base
In 2014, the Russian Navy announced plans to establish a base on the island. The bases on Wrangel Island and on Cape Schmidt on Russia's Arctic coast reportedly consist of two sets of 34 prefabricated modules.

In literature
In Jules Verne's novel César Cascabel, the protagonists float past Wrangel Island on an iceberg. In Verne's description, a live volcano is located on the island: "Between the two capes on its southern coast, Cape Hawan and Cape Thomas, it is surmounted by a live volcano, which is marked on the recent maps." In Chukchi author Yuri Rytkheu's historical novel A Dream in Polar Fog, set in the early 20th century, the Chukchi knew of Wrangel Island and referred to it as the "Invisible Land" or "Invisible Island".

See also
 Russian Arctic islands
 List of islands of Russia
 List of nature reserves in Russia
 World Heritage Sites in Russia

References

Works cited

External links

 Anonymous, 2008, Oceandots.com (aerial image and description of Wrangel Island)
 Pictures from Wrangel Island. , 2007.
 Bureau of European and Eurasian Affairs, 2003, Status of Wrangel and Other Arctic Islands. U.S. Department of State, Washington, D.C. (Fact sheet on Wrangel Island.)
 Eglin, Libby, 2000, Run For Wrangel. Tourist's account and photography.
 Eime, Roderick, nd, Wrangel Island: Isolation, Desolation and Tragedy. Comments about history and tourism of Wrangel Island.
 Gray, D., 2003, The story of the Canadian Arctic Expedition of 1913–1918. Virtual Museum of Canada, Canadian Museum of Civilization, Gatineau, Quebec. (Includes Loss of the Karluk and Wrangel Island)
 Gualtieri, L., nd, The Late Pleistocene Glacial and Sea Level History of Wrangel Island, Northeast Siberia.  Quaternary Research Center, University of Washington. (Numerous comments, picture, papers, links, concerning various aspects of Wrangel Island)
 Detailed map of Wrangel Island (click link in list)
 McClanahan, A.J., nd, The Heroine of Wrangel Island.   LitSite, Alaska. (Article about Ada Blackjack Johnson and Wrangel Island.)
 MacPhee, Ross, nd, Siberian Expedition to Wrangel Island., American Museum of Natural History, New York. (Hunting mammoths on Wrangel Island)
 Muir, John, 1917, The Cruise of the Corwin: Journal of the Arctic Expedition of 1881 in search of De Long and the Jeannette. Norman S. Berg, Dunwoody, Georgia. John Muir's description of the 1881 exploration of Wrangel Island.
 Natural Heritage Protection Fund, 2008, Wrangel Island. Moscow, Russian Federation. (Web page about the Wrangel Island World Heritage Site.)
 Rosse, I.C., 1883, The First Landing on Wrangel Island: With Some Remarks on the Northern Inhabitants. Journal of the American Geographical Society of New York. vol. 15, pp. 163–214. Text files from Project Gutenberg. (Also, available from JSTOR)
 Stefansson, Vilhjalmur, 1921, The friendly Arctic; the story of five years in polar regions G. P. Putnam's Sons, New York, 319 pp.
 UNESCO World Heritage Committee, nd, Natural System of Wrangel Island Reserve. United Nations Educational, Scientific and Cultural Organization, New York.
 Russian Refuge published May 2013 National Geographic magazine

 
Ecoregions of Russia
Palearctic ecoregions
Tundra ecoregions
World Heritage Sites in Russia
Important Bird Areas of Russia
Important Bird Areas of Arctic islands
Zapovednik
International territorial disputes of the United States
Territorial disputes of Russia